Gabriel Aivazovsky or Ayvazyan (22 May 1812 – 20 April 1879) was an Armenian Catholic archbishop, scholar, educator and historian. He was the elder brother of the artist Ivan Aivazovsky.

Biography
Gabriel Aivazovsky was born in Feodosia into a family of Armenian merchants. He received a scientific education at the Mkhitarist Monastery on San Lazzaro Island in Venice. He was also a teacher of Oriental languages. In 1848, he was appointed a director of the Armenian College Samuel Moorat in Sèvres, and subsequently founded the same Armenian college. His most important works are "Essay on the History of Russia" (in Armenian, Venice, 1836), "History of the Ottoman State" (also in Armenian, 2 volumes, Venice, 1841). He was also one of the main staff of Paschal Aucher's (Harutiun Avgerian) Armenian dictionary. In 1843, he and Ghevont Alishan founded Bazmavep, the very first Armenian scholarly journal.

See also
Ivan Aivazovsky
Armenians in Ukraine
Armenians in Crimea

References

External links
  Энциклопедия фонда Хай-Азг
  Русская история в портретах

Armenian Apostolic Christians
Armenian academics
Armenian people from the Russian Empire
1812 births
1879 deaths
San Lazzaro degli Armeni alumni
19th-century Armenian historians